Trachelizinae is a subfamily of primitive weevils in the family of beetles known as Brentidae. There are at least 110 genera and 710 described species in Trachelizinae.

See also
 List of Trachelizinae genera

References

Further reading

External links

 

Brentidae